The 1978 United States Senate election in Minnesota was held on November 7, 1978. Incumbent Democratic U.S. Senator Wendell Anderson was defeated by Republican challenger Rudy Boschwitz.

The "Minnesota Massacre"
In 1978, Minnesota's top three statewide offices were all up for election: the governorship and both U.S. Senate seats. But there was a particular oddity to the races: the incumbents, each a member of the Democratic-Farmer-Labor Party, were all appointed to their offices, not elected. (Republicans took advantage of this, putting up billboards that read, "The DFL is going to face something scary — an election".)

First, after Walter Mondale was elected Vice President in 1976, sitting Governor Wendell Anderson resigned so that Lieutenant Governor Rudy Perpich, as the new governor, could appoint Anderson to the open seat. This did not sit well with the electorate. Then, in January 1978, Minnesota's other Senate seat opened up when Hubert Humphrey died; Perpich appointed Humphrey's widow, Muriel, to the office. But she did not want to run that fall, and the DFL nominated Bob Short for the post.

Though Democrats maintained large majorities in both the U.S. House and Senate, the November election was something of a disappointment for them, as they lost a handful of seats in both chambers. But for Minnesota's DFL it was a disaster, later dubbed the "Minnesota Massacre". Plywood magnate Rudy Boschwitz campaigned as a liberal Republican, freely spent his own money, and defeated Anderson by 16 points, while David Durenberger crushed Short by 26 points. Al Quie completed the Republican trifecta by downing Perpich 52% to 45%. (Perpich would be reelected governor in 1982 and 1986.)

The results in Minnesota marked the first time the GOP had held all three offices since Joseph H. Ball left the Senate in January 1949. Additionally, this election and the special election both marked the first time since 1958 that both Senate seats in a state flipped from one party to the other in a single election cycle.

Democratic–Farmer–Labor primary

Candidates

Declared
 Daryl W. Anderson
 Wendell Anderson, Incumbent U.S. Senator since 1976
 Dick Bullock
 John S. Connolly, lawyer
 Emil L. Moses
 Lloyd M. Roberts

Results

Independent-Republican primary

Candidates

Declared
 Rudy Boschwitz, Businessman
 Harold Stassen, Former Governor of Minnesota (1939-1943)

Results

American Party primary

Candidates

Declared
 Sal Carlone

Results

General election

Results

See also 
 1978 United States Senate elections

References 

1978 Minnesota elections
Minnesota
1978